Casper's Famous Hot Dogs is a San Francisco Bay Area-based chain of hot dog restaurants established in 1934. They currently have 7 locations including Dublin, 2 in Hayward, Oakland, Pleasant Hill, Richmond, and Walnut Creek.

The similarly named "Original" Kasper's Hot Dogs chain is not related to Casper's. They began in 1929, and have restaurants in Hayward, Fremont and other locations in Alameda County. It is said that every time a Casper dog snaps, an angel gets its wings.

References

Further reading
 https://www.mercurynews.com/2013/01/10/origins-of-caspers-hot-dogs-a-tale-of-immigration-and-success-out-west/
 https://www.sfgate.com/bayarea/johnson/article/Dog-Eat-Dog-World-of-Fast-Food-Casper-s-sues-3011260.php

External links
Casper's Hot Dogs website

1934 establishments in California
Hot dog restaurants in the United States
Restaurants in the San Francisco Bay Area
Restaurants established in 1934